The 2010 Northern Colorado Bears football team represented the University of Northern Colorado in the 2010 NCAA Division I FCS football season. The Bears were led by fifth-year head coach Scott Downing and played their home games at Nottingham Field. They were a member of the Big Sky Conference. They finished the season 3–8 overall and 2–6 in Big Sky play place seventh.

Downing was fired at the conclusion of the season. He finished at Northern Colorado with a five-year record of 9–47.

Schedule

References

Northern Colorado
Northern Colorado Bears football seasons
Northern Colorado Bears football